The Kauai nukupuu (Hemignathus hanapepe) was a species of nukupuʻu once found throughout parts of the Hawaiian island of Kauai. It was an insect eater that picked out its tiny prey from tree bark. The males were yellowish with brown wings, while the females were grayish brown with a yellow throat streak.

Conservation
 
The species was abundant until the 19th century, when the loss of its lowland forests to slash and burn farming methods damaged its habitat. By 1889, this bird was very rare, though it could still be found in small flocks in the higher forests. The last confirmed sighting was in 1899; if the species survived after this time, it likely became confined to the Alakaʻi Wilderness Preserve. From 1984-1998, it was recorded several times in this area, but later analysis of these sightings indicates that almost all these observations were likely of Kauaʻi ʻamakihi (Chlorodrepanis stejnegeri). It was also feared that the winds from Hurricane Iniki in 1992 could have created more damage to the bird's habitat. Intensive searches for this species throughout the 1990s were unsuccessful, although a single unconfirmed report was made in 2007. The species was likely already extinct by 1906, but the recency of some of the unconfirmed sightings indicates that the species should likely not be classified as extinct unless there is no doubt that it is. In September 2021, the U.S. Fish and Wildlife Service proposed that the Kauaʻi nukupuʻu extinct, citing fruitless and extensive surveys.

References

External links

Hemignathus
Hawaiian honeycreepers
Biota of Kauai
Endemic birds of Hawaii
Critically endangered fauna of Hawaii
Birds described in 1889
Taxa named by Scott Barchard Wilson
ESA endangered species